Maha Sajan (槃羅茶全) or Bàn La Trà Toàn(槃羅茶全), Panluo Chaquan in Chinese sources, was king of Champa from 1460 to 1471, the year of the fall of Champa.  In 1471, in a reaction to a Cham raid against Hóa Châu, the emperor Lê Thánh Tông of Đại Việt (Vietnam), invaded Champa.

The Vietnamese captured the Cham capital of Vijaya, murdering 60,000 and imprisoning another 30,000. P'an-Lo T'ou-Ts'iuan was captured, became ill and died on junk taking him away.

This was the final defeat of Champa, which then became three minor principalities under the protection Đại Việt.

References 

Kings of Champa
Hindu monarchs
1471 deaths
Vietnamese monarchs
Posthumous executions